HD 14622 is a single star in the northern constellation of Andromeda. It is dimly visible to the naked eye under good seeing conditions, having an apparent visual magnitude of 5.81. The star is moving closer to the Earth with a heliocentric radial velocity of −35 km/s, and is predicted to come within  in around 812,000 years.

The stellar classification of HD 14622 is F0 III–IV, showing a mixed spectrum of an evolving subgiant and giant star; suggesting this is an intermediate-mass star that has used up its core hydrogen and is expanding. The star is suspected of being slightly variable, but this has not been conclusively proven. It is around 890 million years old with 1.69 times the mass of the Sun. The star is radiating 8 times the Sun's luminosity from its photosphere at an effective temperature of approximately 7,000.

References

F-type giants
Andromeda (constellation)
Durchmusterung objects
014622
011090
0687